Greg "GD" Downing (born March 24, 1985, in Auburn, New York) is a professional lacrosse player with the Denver Outlaws of Major League Lacrosse and with the Colorado Mammoth of the National Lacrosse League.  He was selected to participate in the 2008 and 2009 MLL All-Star Games.

College
Downing attended Fairfield University, where he was a three-time All-American.  In 2005, Downing helped lead the Stags to the Great Western Lacrosse League Championship and the NCAA Men's Lacrosse Championship Tournament. Also in 2006 and 2007, he was selected for the Tewaaraton Trophy Preseason Watchlist, given to the nation's most outstanding NCAA lacrosse player. During his college career Downing produced 141 points, on 101 goals and 40 assists. Downing was clocked shooting the ball 109 mph in practice.

Professional
Downing was drafted in the 1st round (6th overall) of the 2007 Major League Lacrosse Collegiate Draft by the Los Angeles Riptide.  Downing was also selected in the 4th round (43rd overall) in the 2007 National Lacrosse League expansion draft by the Boston Blazers.   As a member of the Los Angeles Riptide, Downing was selected to play in the 2008 MLL All-Star Game, and as a member of the Denver Outlaws he was selected to play in the 2009 MLL All-Star Game. Downing won the 2011 MLL championship with the Boston Cannons and the 2016 MLL Championship with the Denver Outlaws. On March 14, 2018, Downing retired from the MLL.

Team USA
Downing was one of 18 players named to the United States men's national lacrosse team by U.S. Indoor Lacrosse and participated at the 2011 World Indoor Lacrosse Championship in Prague, Czech Republic, in May 2011, where he won the bronze medal. At the 2015 World Indoor Lacrosse Championship, hosted by the Onondaga nation, Downing was again a member of the team, and again won the bronze medal. In 2019, Downing was named to the team again.

External links
Boston Blazers Profile
"The Goal" - 2005 Last Second Game Winning Goal vs. Notre Dame

References

1985 births
Living people
American lacrosse players
Boston Blazers players
Minnesota Swarm players
Georgia Swarm players
Fairfield Stags men's lacrosse players
Major League Lacrosse players
Denver Outlaws players
Sportspeople from Auburn, New York